The Gerrhosauridae are a family of lizards native to Africa and Madagascar.

Habitat
Also known as plated lizards, species in the family Gerrhosauridae live in a range of habitats, from rocky crevices to sand dunes.

Description
Their form is variable, some species having four fully developed limbs, and others having vestigial hind limbs only.

Reproduction
Most species are believed to be oviparous.

Classification
Family Gerrhosauridae
Subfamily Gerrhosaurinae
Genus Broadleysaurus - rough-scaled plated lizard (1 species)
Genus Cordylosaurus - blue-black plated lizard (1 species)
Genus Gerrhosaurus - (7 species)
Genus Matobosaurus - (2 species)
Genus Tetradactylus - (8 species)
Subfamily Zonosaurinae
Genus Tracheloptychus - keeled plated lizards (2 species)
Genus Zonosaurus - zonosaurs (17 species)

References

Further reading
Boulenger GA (1887). Catalogue of the Lizards in the British Museum (Natural History). Second Edition. Volume III. Lacertidæ, Gerrhosauridæ ... London: Trustees of the British Museum (Natural History). (Taylor and Francis, printers). xii + 575 pp. + Plates I-XL. (Family "Gerrhosauridæ", pp. 119–120).
Branch, Bill (2004). Field Guide to Snakes and other Reptiles of Southern Africa. Sanibel Island, Florida: Ralph Curtis Books. 399 pp. . (Family Gerrhosauridae, pp. 176–177).
Fitzinger L (1843). Systema Reptilium, Fasciculus Primus, Amblyglossae. Vienna: Braumüller & Seidel. 106 pp. + indices. ("Gerrhosauri", new family, p. 21). (in Latin).

External links
 https://web.archive.org/web/20100616084347/http://www.jcvi.org/reptiles/families/gerrhosauridae.php

 
Lizard families
Taxa named by Leopold Fitzinger